is the pen name of , a Japanese manga artist and photographer. Noted for her works in the ladies' manga genre that feature ecchi themes and subject material, Morizono has been called the "Queen of Ladies' Manga" and noted by Rachel Matt Thorn as "the most popular and respected creator of erotic manga for women".

Biography
Morizono was born Hiroko Mizoguchi on December 25, 1957, in Tokuyama (now Shūnan), Yamaguchi Prefecture, where she drew manga as a child. In 1977, she married and began work as an office lady, but departed the job after a year. In 1981, she divorced her husband and made her professional debut as a manga artist with Crazy Love Hisshouhou published in the manga magazine Shōjo Comic. She won a Shogakukan Manga Award for new artists that same year.

From 1981 to 1986, Morizono primarily created shōjo manga (girls' comics) and gag cartoons for seinen manga (young men's comics) magazines. As ladies' manga began to incorporate more mature elements such as erotica and S&M in the late 1980s and early 1990s, Morizono began to create manga for the genre exclusively. During this period, she began publishing under the name "Milk" as a pen name that was "catchy and feminine". Between 1986 and 1995, Morizono published over 35 paperbacks and earned the nickname of "the Queen of Ladies' Manga".

In 1991, Morizono published the erotic manga series Peacemaker in Midori, a shōjo manga magazine published by Kodansha. The series received complaints from the police, parent–teacher associations, housewife groups, and politicians, and prompted Kodansha to pressure the editors of Midori to cease publishing works deemed "harmful". Kodansha refused to publish tankōbon volumes of Morizono's manga unless Peacemaker was revised, which Morizono refused; ultimately, neither Morizono nor Kodansha earned royalties from Peacemaker, and the series was not renewed despite its popularity. As a result, Morizono began primarily publishing works through Shodensha, a smaller company that published a tankōbon of Peacemaker in its uncensored form.

Morizono was married to manga artist  until his murder in 2010. She published an autobiographical manga on Murasaki's death, in the digital manga magazine  in 2017. In addition to her manga work, Morizono also works as a photographer.

Style
Morizono is known for her "glamorous and media-friendly" public persona and describes her art as etchi, a term broadly used to describe works that are erotic  but not explicitly pornographic. Though sex figures heavily into her manga, her works do not render genitalia or pubic hair, and typically feature significant plot and character development in addition to sex scenes. Recurring elements in her work include "wealthy, jet-set young women" who find themselves in a variety of sexual scenarios, foreign settings, and gay characters. Unlike many manga artists who both write and illustrate their manga, Morizono frequently does not write her material, opting to instead work with new and unestablished writers with whom she shares 30 percent of the series' royalties.

Works
The following works have been published by Morizono:

Notes

References

Bibliography

External links
 Official website 
 

1957 births
Japanese female comics artists
Japanese erotic artists
Living people
Manga artists
Women manga artists